Samuel M. Raimi (born October 23, 1959) is an American filmmaker. He is best known for directing the Spider-Man trilogy (2002–2007) and the Evil Dead franchise (1981–present). He also directed the 1990 superhero film Darkman, the 1995 revisionist western The Quick and the Dead, the 1998 neo-noir crime-thriller A Simple Plan, the 2000 supernatural thriller film The Gift, the 2009 supernatural horror film Drag Me to Hell, and the 2013 Disney fantasy film Oz the Great and Powerful. His films are known for their highly dynamic visual style, inspired by comic books and slapstick comedy.

Raimi has also produced several successful television series, including Hercules: The Legendary Journeys and its spin-off Xena: Warrior Princess. He founded the production company Renaissance Pictures in 1979 and Ghost House Pictures in 2002. His latest film, the Marvel Cinematic Universe film Doctor Strange in the Multiverse of Madness, was released on May 6, 2022, being the highest-grossing film of his career.

Early life
Raimi was born in Royal Oak, Michigan, to a Conservative Jewish family. He is a son of merchants Celia Barbara (née Abrams) and Leonard Ronald Raimi. His ancestors were Jewish immigrants from Russia and Hungary. His younger brother Ted is an actor, and his older brother Ivan is a screenwriter and physician. His older sister, Andrea Raimi Rubin, is a court reporter. Another older brother, Sander, died at 15 in an accidental drowning; Raimi has said that the trauma knitted the remaining family closer together and "colored everything he's done for the rest of his life." Raimi also mentioned that Sander first introduced him to Spider-Man, igniting his love for comics.

Raimi graduated from Groves High School and later went on to attend Michigan State University, where he studied English but left after three semesters to film The Evil Dead.

Career

Film
Raimi became fascinated with making films when his father brought a movie camera home one day. He began to make Super 8 movies with his friend Bruce Campbell, whom he met in 1975. In college, he teamed up with his brother's roommate Robert Tapert and Campbell to shoot Within the Woods (1978), a 32-minute horror film which raised $375,000, as well as his debut feature film It's Murder!. During that time, he also shot the seven-minute short film Clockwork (1978), starring Scott Spiegel (who had appeared in Within the Woods) and Cheryl Guttridge. Through family, friends, and a network of investors, Raimi was able to finance production of the highly successful horror film The Evil Dead (1981) which became a cult hit and effectively launched Raimi's career.

He began work on his third film Crimewave (1985), which he co-wrote with the then unknown Coen brothers, shortly after. Intended as a live-action comic book, the film was unsuccessful, partly due to unwanted studio intervention. Raimi then returned to the horror genre with the seminal Evil Dead II (which added slapstick humor to the over the top horror, showcasing his love of the Three Stooges). With his brother Ivan Raimi (and crediting himself as Celia Abrams), Sam Raimi also wrote Easy Wheels (1989), which parodied the Outlaw biker film genre. A long-time comic book buff, he then attempted to adapt "The Shadow" into a movie, but was unable to secure the rights, so he created his own super-hero, Darkman (1990). The film was his first major studio picture, and was commercially successful, spawning two sequels. Through it he was still able to secure funding for Evil Dead III, which was retitled Army of Darkness and turned away almost totally from horror towards fantasy and comedy elements. Army of Darkness, the final movie in the Evil Dead trilogy, commercially underperformed, yet on video became a cult classic.

In the 1990s, Raimi moved into other genres, directing such films as the western The Quick and the Dead (starring Sharon Stone and Gene Hackman), the critically acclaimed crime thriller A Simple Plan (1998) (starring Bill Paxton and Billy Bob Thornton), and the romantic drama For Love of the Game (1999) (starring Kevin Costner).

Raimi achieved great critical and commercial success with the blockbuster Spider-Man (2002), which was adapted from the comic book series of the same name. The movie grossed over US$800 million worldwide, spawning two sequels: Spider-Man 2 and Spider-Man 3, both directed by Raimi and each grossing approximately $800 million. After the completion of the third Spider-Man film, he planned on producing two more sequels (although Sony Pictures planned three sequels) but could not find a satisfactory script. In 2022, reflecting on Spider-Man 3, Raimi told Rolling Stone: "It was a very painful experience for me. I wanted to make a Spider-Man movie to redeem myself for that. [The aborted] Spider-Man 4 — that was really what that was about. I wanted to go out on a high note. I didn't want to just make another one that pretty much worked. I had a really high standard in my mind. And I didn’t think I could get that script to the level that I was hoping for by that start date." He, along with Marc Webb, were both brought on as creative consultants for Marvel Studios' Spider-Man: No Way Home, directed by Jon Watts.

Raimi frequently collaborates with Joel and Ethan Coen, beginning when Joel was one of the editors of Evil Dead. The Coens co-wrote Crimewave and The Hudsucker Proxy with Raimi in the mid-1980s (though Hudsucker was not produced for almost a decade). Raimi made cameo appearances in Miller's Crossing, The Hudsucker Proxy, and with Joel Coen in Spies Like Us. The Coen brothers gave Raimi advice on shooting in snow for A Simple Plan, based on their experiences with Fargo.

He worked in front of the camera in The Stand as a dimwitted hitman, John Carpenter's Body Bags as a murdered gas station attendant, and Indian Summer in what is perhaps his biggest role as a bumbling assistant to Alan Arkin. The film was written by his childhood friend, writer-director Mike Binder, and shot at the camp that they both attended when they were younger. Raimi also produced the entire English-language The Grudge franchise, based on the original Japanese films.

According to Entertainment Weekly, Raimi had expressed an interest in directing a film version of The Hobbit, the prequel to the Lord of the Rings trilogy. In 2008, Guillermo del Toro was selected as the director, with Peter Jackson as the executive producer. Raimi may direct By Any Means Necessary, the next film based on the "Jack Ryan" CIA character created by Tom Clancy for Paramount Pictures. Disney also approached him to direct W.I.T.C.H.: The Movie, based on the popular comic.

Blizzard Entertainment announced on July 22, 2009 that Raimi would be directing a film adaptation of the Warcraft video game series, but at Comic-Con International 2012, it was revealed that he would not be the director.

On September 23, 2009, he became the producer for the British supernatural thriller Refuge, which is directed by Corin Hardy and published by Mandate Pictures. He will produce the remake of the Danish thriller The Substitute, which will be directed by Scott Derrickson under his new label Spooky Pictures. Raimi produced with his company Ghost House Pictures the British thriller flick Burst 3D, directed by Neil Marshall.

Raimi directed Oz the Great and Powerful, which was released on March 8, 2013 by Walt Disney Pictures and grossed $493 million worldwide. He said he would not be directing the planned sequel.

On December 11, 2006, the website SuperHero Hype reported that director Sam Raimi and Michael Uslan would co-produce a new film version of The Shadow for Columbia Pictures. On October 16, 2007, Raimi stated that: "I don't have any news on The Shadow at this time, except that the company that I have with Josh Donen, my producing partner, we've got the rights to The Shadow. I love the character very much and we're trying to work on a story that'll do justice to the character."

Raimi, along with Bruce Campbell and Rob Tapert, produced the remake of Raimi's The Evil Dead. First-time feature filmmaker Fede Álvarez wrote and directed, and Diablo Cody was also brought in to revise/rewrite the script. Raimi confirmed plans to write Evil Dead 4 with his brother; it was later specified that this film would be Army of Darkness 2.<ref>{{cite web|url=https://screenrant.com/army-of-darkness-2-evil-dead-4-sam-raimi|title=Sam Raimi's Next Project is Army of Darkness 2′' Not Evil Dead 4|date=March 11, 2013 |publisher=Screenrant.com|access-date=March 17, 2013}}</ref> Alvarez revealed that Raimi would direct the sequel to Army of Darkness. However, in a 2014 interview, Bruce Campbell announced that Army of Darkness 2 is not happening, saying "It's all internet b.s. There's no reality whatsoever. These random comments slip out of either my mouth, or Sam Raimi's mouth, next thing you know, we're making a sequel."

On February 26, 2016, it was confirmed that Raimi is attached to direct the upcoming film World War 3 for Warner Bros. The film will be based on a possible future inspired by the book The Next 100 Years by George Friedman.

On February 16, 2017, it was reported that Raimi will be directing a thriller about the Bermuda Triangle for Skydance Media, with the script being written by Doug Miro and Carlo Bernard.

By January 29, 2018, Raimi was set to direct the first in the movie adaptations of Patrick Rothfuss's Kingkiller Chronicle series, The Name of the Wind, with Rothfuss and Lin-Manuel Miranda serving as executive producers.

On February 5, 2020, it was announced that Raimi was in talks with Marvel Studios to direct Doctor Strange in the Multiverse of Madness, and Raimi confirmed his involvement in April 2020. This marks Raimi's return to the superhero film genre after more than 15 years following Spider-Man 3 in 2007 and his first feature film directorial effort since 2013's Oz the Great and Powerful.Television
In addition to film, Raimi has worked in television, producing such series as Hercules: The Legendary Journeys and its spin-off Xena: Warrior Princess, both featuring his younger brother Ted Raimi and long-time friend Bruce Campbell, American Gothic, Cleopatra 2525, M.A.N.T.I.S., 13: Fear Is Real, Young Hercules, and Jack of All Trades. In 2008, Raimi executive produced a syndicated TV series called Legend of the Seeker, based on Terry Goodkind's best-selling The Sword of Truth fantasy series. He also executive produced the Starz original television series Spartacus: Blood and Sand and Spartacus: Gods of the Arena, Spartacus: Vengeance and Spartacus: War of the Damned. He directed the pilot episode of Ash vs Evil Dead for Starz.

Personal life
Since 1993, Raimi has been married to Gillian Greene, daughter of Canadian actor Lorne Greene. They have five children; their three eldest, daughter Emma Rose and sons Lorne and Henry, appeared as extras in Drag Me to Hell and during the final battle in Spider-Man 3''.

Filmography

Film

Short films

Television

Executive producer only

Acting roles

Awards
 Sitges – Catalan International Film Festival Prize of the International Critics' Jury 1981
 Sitges – Catalan International Film Festival Best Director Award 1990
 Sitges – Catalan International Film Festival Time-Machine Honorary Award 1992
 Brussels International Festival of Fantasy Film Golden Raven Award 1993
 Fantasporto Critics' Award 1993
 Cognac Festival du Film Policier Special Jury Prize 1999
 Saturn Award Best Director Award 2004
 Empire Award Best Director Award 2004
 Inkpot Award 2014

See also 
 Sam Raimi's unrealized projects

References

External links

 

 
1959 births
20th-century American screenwriters
21st-century American screenwriters
Action film directors
American male film actors
American male screenwriters
American people of Hungarian-Jewish descent
American people of Russian-Jewish descent
Fantasy film directors
Film directors from Michigan
Film producers from Michigan
Horror film directors
Inkpot Award winners
Living people
Male actors from Michigan
Michigan State University alumni
People from Royal Oak, Michigan
Raimi family
Screenwriters from Michigan
Postmodernist filmmakers